The following lists events that happened during 1995 in Sri Lanka.

Incumbents
President: Chandrika Kumaratunga
Prime Minister: Sirimavo Bandaranaike
Chief Justice: G. P. S. de Silva

Governors
 Central Province – E. L. Senanayake 
 North Central Province – Maithripala Senanayake 
 North Eastern Province – vacant (until 13 January); Gamini Fonseka (starting 13 January)
 North Western Province – Anandatissa de Alwis (until 12 January); Hector Arawwawala (starting 12 January)
 Sabaragamuwa Province – C. N. Saliya Mathew
 Southern Province – vacant (until 12 January); Neville Kanakeratne (starting 12 January)
 Uva Province – Ananda Dassanayake (starting January)
 Western Province – K. Vignarajah (starting January)

Chief Ministers
 Central Province – W. M. P. B. Dissanayake 
 North Central Province – G. D. Mahindasoma 
 North Western Province – Nimal Bandara 
 Sabaragamuwa Province – Jayatilake Podinilame 
 Southern Province – Mahinda Yapa Abeywardena 
 Uva Province – Percy Samaraweera
 Western Province – Morris Rajapaksa (until 11 July); Susil Premajayanth (starting 13 July)

Events
On 25 May 1995, the Kallarawa massacre was carried out by the LTTE, killing 42 Sinhalese civilians after LTTE cadres stormed the area. 
On 22 September 1995, the Sri Lankan Air Force bombed the Nagar Kovil Maha Vidyalayam school in Jaffna, resulting in the deaths of roughly 34-71 Sri Lankan Tamil civilians based on multiple accounts.

Notes 

a.  Gunaratna, Rohan. (1998). Pg.353, Sri Lanka's Ethnic Crisis and National Security, Colombo: South Asian Network on Conflict Research.

References